Pallamano Romagna is a men's handball club from Imola and Mordano, Italy, that plays in the Serie A. The club was born in 2001, from the fusion of H.C. Imola 1973 and U.S. Mordano 1978.

European record

Team

Current squad 
Squad for the 2022–23 season

Goalkeepers
16  Martino Redaelli
64  Adrian Lombes 

Wingers
4  Christian Amaroli
6  Tommaso Albertini
18  Martin Di Domenico 
23  Noè Ramondini

Line players 
10  Mohammed Essam
11  Filippo Gollini
17  Federico Nori

Back players
3  Nicolò Bianconi
5  Grigory Fioretti
7  Gregorio Mazzanti
8  Dario Chiarini
12  Fabrizio Tassinari 
13  Claudio Lo Cicero
15  Alexandru Rotaru
24  Amir Boukhris
73  Víctor Alonso
88  Ivan Antić

External links
Official website

Romagna Handball
Imola